Belsky is a rural locality (a village) in Kaginsky Selsoviet, Beloretsky District, Bashkortostan, Russia. The population was 56 as of 2010. There are 2 streets.

Geography 
Belsky is located 83 km southwest of Beloretsk (the district's administrative centre) by road. Kaga is the nearest rural locality.

References 

Rural localities in Beloretsky District